Zadar Airport is an international airport serving Zadar, Croatia. It is located in Zemunik Donji,  from the centre of Zadar.

History
As early as 1936, Zadar (then part of the Italian Province of Zara) had regular commercial flights initially provided by Ala Littoria.
Over time the airport has grown to become Croatia's 4th largest international airport, handling 801,347 annual passengers. It used to be one of a few airports in the world where the taxiway crossed a public road. The road was closed on 7 April 2010 due to terms negotiated with the European Union during Croatian accession negotiations.  In 2020 an underpass was built and the road was reopened.
 
At the beginning of April 2013, Zadar Airport became a Ryanair base with a stationed Boeing 737-800. In December 2019, Lauda announced the stationing of three Airbus A320 aircraft during the summer 2020 timetable period. A set of 11 new routes were announced by the airline for summer 2020. Due to the ongoing COVID-19 pandemic the airline postponed the opening of the base to July 2021, where it will station two Airbus A320-200 and serve 37 destinations.

Facilities
The airport also is a Croatian Air Force main training base. It used to be a base for Lufthansa's InterCockpit flight school.

Airlines and destinations
The following airlines operate regular scheduled and charter flights at Zadar Airport:

Statistics

References

External links

 Official website

Airports in Croatia
Airport
Buildings and structures in Zadar County
Transport in Zadar County